Do Hard Things: A Teenage Rebellion Against Low Expectations is a popular Christian book authored by Alex and Brett Harris, founders of The Rebelution. It was published by WaterBrook Multnomah, a division of Random House, on April 15, 2008.

Do Hard Things has been one of the top 10 religious titles on Nielsen BookScan, and was an Amazon.com bestseller.

Synopsis 
In Do Hard Things, the Harris brothers attempt to "explode the myth of adolescence," and show that prior to the 20th century, a person was an adult or a child. The book challenges teenagers to go beyond their comfort zone, and, in essence, "do hard things." The foreword was contributed by Chuck Norris.

False news 
On April 1, 2020, a satirical blog post by Nathaniel Hendry sparked false rumors that the Harris twins had recanted their book, similarly to how their older brother, Joshua Harris had recanted his bestseller, I Kissed Dating Goodbye.

References

External links 
 
 Do Hard Things at Random House
 Why We Do Hard Things at Christianity Today
 Teen's vision brings water to Darfur at Baptist Press

2008 non-fiction books
Religious books